Robert Henry Grey (July 17, 1891 – April 26, 1934) was an American film actor of the silent film era. He appeared in 53 films between 1911 and 1933. He was born in Oakland, California, and died in Los Angeles, California.

Selected filmography
 The Twelfth Juror (1913)
 Through the Neighbor's Window (1913)
 Shadows and Sunshine (1916)
 Spellbound (1916) as Graham
 Mentioned in Confidence (1917)
 Twin Kiddies (1917)
 Bab the Fixer (1917)
 All of a Sudden Norma (1919)
 Speed (1922)
 The Silent Partner (1923)

External links

1891 births
1934 deaths
Male actors from California
American male film actors
American male silent film actors
20th-century American male actors